Blindoldfreak (Officially: blindoldfreak) is the Electronic-Alternative solo project of Alessandro Cortini (best known as part of the Nine Inch Nails touring lineup from 2005 to 2008 and again since 2013). Cortini uses primarily the Buchla 200e when recording as Blindoldfreak, distinguishing it from his other solo work under the alias SONOIO and under his given name.

Discography

2009: 1 (EP)

References

External links

Official sites
Blindoldfreak Official website
Blindoldfreak page on MySpace
User profile on YouTube
Videos hosted on Vimeo
Profile on Facebook
Audio tracks hosted on SoundCloud

Articles
Who Is Blind Old Freak?

Electronica musicians